Yi Peiji (28 February 1880 – September 1937) was a Chinese politician, scholar, and educator.

Life and career
Yi was born in Changsha, Hunan, on February 28, 1880. He graduated from Hubei Fangyan College (now Wuhan University), then he went to Japan to study under Zhang Taiyan.

After the establishment of Republic of China, he became a secretary of Li Yuanhong. Then he taught at Changsha Normal College and Hunan First Normal University, his students included Mao Zedong, Cai Hesen, Xiao Zisheng, Xiao San, He Shuheng, Li Weihan, and Li Lisan.

He held the three responsibilities of president of Hunan Provincial Library, secretary-general of Hunan government, and president of Hunan First Normal University from June 1920 to November 1920. Then he served as president of Beijing Women's Normal University (now Beijing Normal University).  He was Minister of Education in December 1925, and held that office until March 1926. In 1927 he became president of National Labor University, a position he held until September 1930. He served as minister of Agricultural and Mineral between October 1928 to November 1930. In March 1929, he was appointed director of National Palace Museum, he remained in that position until November 1930, when he was appointed president of National Beiping Normal College (now Beijing Normal University).

He died of illness in Shanghai in September 1937.

References

External links

1880 births
1937 deaths
Politicians from Changsha
National Wuhan University alumni
Education Ministers of the Republic of China
Political office-holders in Hunan
Directors of National Palace Museum
Republic of China politicians from Hunan
Presidents of Hunan First Normal University
Presidents of Beijing Normal University
Educators from Hunan